Bloom City is an unincorporated community located, in the town of Bloom, in Richland County, Wisconsin, United States.

References

Unincorporated communities in Richland County, Wisconsin
Unincorporated communities in Wisconsin